Angus Wells (26 March 1943 – 11 April 2006) was a British writer of genre fiction, including fantasy and westerns. Wells wrote under numerous pseudonyms, including Andrew Quiller (with Kenneth Bulmer and Laurence James), James A. Muir, Charles R. Pike (with Kenneth Bulmer and Terry Harknett), William S. Brady (with John Harvey), J. D. Sandon (with John Harvey), Charles C. Garrett (with Laurence James), Richard Kirk (with Robert Holdstock), J. B. Dancer (with John Harvey), and Ian Evans.

Bibliography

Novels

Exiles
 Exile's Children (1995)
 Exile's Challenge (1996)

Godwars
 Forbidden Magic (1991)
 Dark Magic (1992)
 Wild Magic (1993)

Book of the Kingdoms
 Wrath of Ashar (1988)
 The Usurper (1989)
 The Way Beneath (1990)

Standalone novels
 Return of a Man Called Horse (1976)
 Star Maidens (1977) (as Ian Evans)
 Brothers McGregor (1985)
 Lords of the Sky (1994)
 The Guardian (1998)
 Yesterday's King (2001)

Novels as Andrew Quiller

The Eagles
 The Hill of the Dead (1975)
 The Land of Mist (1976)
 City of Fire (1976)
 Blood on the Sand (1977)
 Sea of Swords (1977)

Novels as Charles R. Pike

Jubal Cade
 The Killing Trail (1974)
 Double Cross (1974)
 The Hungry Gun (1975)
 Killer Silver (1975)
 Vengeance Hunt (1976)
 The Burning Man (1976)
 The Golden Dead (1976)
 Death Wears Grey (1976)
 Days of Blood (1977)
 The Killing Ground (1977)
 Brand of Vengeance (1978)
 Bounty Road (1978)
 Ashes and Blood (1979)
 The Death Pit (1980)
 Angel of Death (1980)
 Mourning is Red (1981)
 Bloody Christmas (1981)
 Time of the Damned (1982)
 The Waiting Game (1982)
 Spoils of War (1982)
 The Violent Land (1983)
 Gallows Bait (1983)

Novels as Richard Kirk

Raven
 Swordsmistress of Chaos (1978) with Robert Holdstock
 A Time of Ghosts (1978) by Robert Holdstock
 The Frozen God (1978)
 Lords of the Shadows (1979) by Robert Holdstock
 A Time of Dying (1979)

Novels as William S. Brady

Hawk
 The Sudden Guns (1979)
 Blood Money (1979)
 Death's Bounty (1979)
 Killing Time (1980)
 Fool's Gold (1980)
 Blood Kin (1980)
 The Gates of Death (1980)
 Desperadoes (1981)
 The Widowmaker (1981)
 Dead Man's Hand (1981)
 Sierra Gold (1982)
 Death and Jack Shade (1982)
 Killer's Breed (1982)
 Border War (1983)
 Killer! (1983)

Peacemaker
 Comanche! (1981)
 Outlaws (1981)
 Whiplash (1981)
 Lynch Law (1981)
 Blood Run (1982)
 War-Party (1983)
 $1,000 Death (1984)
 The Lost (1984)
 Shoot-Out (1984)

Novels as James A. Muir

Breed
 The Lonely Hunt (1976)
 The Silent Kill (1977)
 Cry For Vengeance (1977)
 Death Stage (1977)
 The Gallows Tree (1978)
 The Judas Goat (1978)
 Time of the Wolf (1978)
 Blood Debt (1979)
 Blood-Stock! (1979)
 Outlaw Road (1979)
 The Dying and the Damned (1980)
 Killer's Moon (1980)
 Bounty Hunter! (1980)
 Spanish Gold (1981)
 Slaughter Time (1981)
 Bad Habits (1981)
 The Day of the Gun (1982)
 The Colour of Death (1982)
 Blood Valley (1983)
 Gundown! (1983)
 Blood Hunt (1984)
 Apache Blood (1985)

Novels as J. D. Sandon

Gringos
 Guns Across the River (1979)
 Cannons in the Rain (1979)
 Fire in the Wind (1979)
 Border Affair (1979)
 Easy Money (1980)
 Mazatlan (1980)
 One Too Many Mornings (1981)
 Wheels of Thunder (1981)
 Durango (1982)
 Survivors (1982)

Novels as Charles C. Garrett

Gunslinger
 The Massacre Trail (1977)
 The Golden Gun (1978)
 White Apache (1978)
 Fifty Calibre Kill (1978)
 Arizona Bloodline (1979)
 Rebel Vengeance (1979)
 Death Canyon (1979)
 Peacemaker! (1980)
 The Russian Lode (1980)
 Blood Target (1981)

Novels as J. B. Dancer

The Lawmen
 Evil Breed (1977)
 Kansas, Bloody Kansas (1977)
 Judgement Day (1978)
 Vengeance Trail (1978)
 The Hanged Man (1979)
 One Way to Die (1980)

External links
 

1943 births
2006 deaths
British writers